American actress and filmmaker Brie Larson has received various awards and nominations. She began acting at age eight, and followed it with minor supporting roles in various films. Her breakthrough came with her critically acclaimed leading performance in the 2013 coming-of-age drama film Short Term 12, for which she was nominated for the Independent Spirit Award and a Critics' Choice Award. She garnered widespread acclaim for her performance as Joy "Ma" Newsome in the 2015 drama Room, for which she won the Academy Award for Best Actress, the Golden Globe Award for Best Actress in a Motion Picture – Drama, the Screen Actors Guild Award for Outstanding Performance by a Female Actor in a Leading Role, the BAFTA Award for Best Actress in a Leading Role, and the Critics' Choice Movie Award for Best Actress.

Major associations

Academy Awards

British Academy Film Awards

Primetime Emmy Awards

Golden Globe Awards

Screen Actors Guild Awards

Critics' associations

Alliance of Women Film Journalists

Austin Film Critics Association

Black Film Critics Circle

Boston Online Film Critics Association

Chicago Film Critics Association

Chlotrudis Society for Independent Film Awards

Central-Ohio Film Critics Association

Critics' Choice Awards

Dallas–Fort Worth Film Critics Association

Denver Film Critics Society

Detroit Film Critics Society

Dublin Film Critics Circle

Florida Film Critics Circle

Georgia Film Critics Association

Houston Film Critics Society

Indiana Film Journalists Association

IndieWire Critics Poll

Internet Film Critic Society

Iowa Film Critics Awards

Las Vegas Film Critics Society

Los Angeles Online Film Critics Society

London Film Critics' Circle

New York Film Critics Online

Nevada Film Critics Society

North Carolina Film Critics Association

North Texas Film Critics Association

Oklahoma Film Critics Circle

Online Film Critics Society

Online Film and Television Association

Phoenix Film Critics Circle

Phoenix Film Critics Society

San Diego Film Critics Society

San Francisco Film Critics Circle

Seattle Film Critics Circle

Southeastern Film Critics Association

St. Louis Film Critics Association

Toronto Film Critics Association

Utah Film Critics Association

Vancouver Film Critics Circle

Village Voice Film Poll

Washington DC Area Film Critics Association

Women Film Critics Circle

Other associations

Australian Academy of Cinema and Television Arts Awards

Awards Circuit Community Awards

Black Reel Awards

Canadian Screen Awards

Capri Hollywood International Film Festival

CinEuphoria Awards

Dorian Awards

DVD Exclusive Awards

Empire Awards

Gold Derby Awards

Golden Schmoes Awards

Gotham Awards

Hamptons International Film Festival

IMDb Awards

International Online Cinema Awards

Irish Film & Television Awards

Independent Spirit Awards

NAACP Image Awards

Nickelodeon Kids' Choice Awards

Locarno International Film Festival

Maui Film Festival

MTV Movie & TV Awards

National Board of Review

National Film & TV Awards

Palm Springs International Film Festival

People's Choice Awards

Santa Barbara International Film Festival

Satellite Awards

Saturn Awards

Seattle International Film Festival

Sundance Film Festival

SXSW Film Festival

Teen Choice Awards

Young Artist Awards

Women in Film Crystal + Lucy Awards

Notes

References

External links
 
 

Larson, Brie